Aimé Étienne Jacquet (born 27 November 1941) is a French former professional football player and manager. He coached the France national team that won the 1998 FIFA World Cup in France, the country's first title.

Biography
Jacquet was born in Sail-sous-Couzan, Loire. He began his career as an amateur player for his local club, US Couzan, while working in a factory. Scouted by Saint-Étienne, he joined Les Verts in 1960. One of the most successful clubs of the time, Saint-Étienne, won an impressive five league titles and three French Cups in his 11 years with the club. He also played for the national side, but his international career failed to take off because Les Bleus performed poorly during his years on the team. In 1973, he left Saint-Étienne for regional rivals Olympique Lyonnais, where he ended his career as a player.

A "provisional" manager
Jacquet worked as a manager for clubs around France and gained an impressive list of accolades for Bordeaux during the 1980s, leading them to three league titles, two French Cups, two European semi-finals and one-quarter-final. Dismissed by President Claude Bez in 1989, he left Bordeaux to hone his managerial skills with more modest teams like Montpellier, and Nancy.

In 1991, he accepted a position with the National Technical Training Centre (Direction Technique Nationale).

In 1992, he was appointed the assistant to then national team manager Gérard Houllier.

After the France national team was knocked out of the running for the 1994 FIFA World Cup by Israel and Bulgaria, Jacquet was made the manager of the national team, but only provisionally. After a promising series of friendly matches including a victory over Italy, his provisional status was upgraded to permanent.

Jacquet initially selected Eric Cantona as captain and made him the team's playmaker. Cantona had successfully restarted his career in the FA Premier League and was playing some of the best football of his career, but he kicked a Crystal Palace fan in January 1995, which earned him a year-long suspension from all international matches.

As Cantona was the key playmaker, Jacquet was forced to make major changes to the team in the wake of his suspension. Jacquet revamped the squad with some new blood and built it around Zinedine Zidane and other younger players, while dropping Cantona, Jean-Pierre Papin, and David Ginola. Jacquet succeeded in helping France qualify for the Euro 96.

Making it all the way to the semi-finals, Les Bleus managed to show they could survive without veterans such as Papin, Cantona, or Ginola. Jacquet himself stated that the team had done well without Cantona, and that he wanted to keep faith with the players who had taken them so far.

From doubt to victory

In the months that followed the Euro 96, Jacquet honed his team's skills in a series of friendly matches. He adopted a very defensive strategy. The press began to criticise the team manager, calling his methods "paleolithic". 

In June 1997 at Le Tournoi, cries of "Resign!" could be heard from the stadium as the French team finished third behind England and Brazil, only coming out ahead of Italy by virtue of goal difference. The press continued to criticise Jacquet.

The media's distrust of Jacquet reached fever pitch in May 1998 when, instead of a list of 22 players meant to play in the World Cup, Jacquet gave a list of 28 players, causing the sports daily L'Équipe to write an editorial arguing that Jacquet was not the right man to lead the French team to victory.

However, all that changed when the team began to play in the play-off rounds for the 1998 FIFA World Cup. It was clear that though Jacquet's team was far from being the most flamboyant in French history, it was a perfectly well-oiled machine that neither injury, nor expulsions, nor suspensions, managed to stop. On 12 July 1998, France soundly beat Brazil 3–0 in the Final. Key to the victory was when Jacquet pointed out to his players that Brazilian marking at set-pieces was somewhat suspect, and Zidane headed two goals in from corner kicks.

Following the victory, Jacquet announced that he was leaving his position as manager of the France national team due to previous pressures and criticisms against him. He then became technical director of French football in August 1998, a position which he held until his retirement in December 2006.

Career statistics

Club

International

Managerial
Source:

Honors

As a player
Saint-Étienne
Division 2: 1962–63
Division 1: 1963–64, 1966–67, 1967–68, 1968–69, 1969–70
Trophée des Champions: 1967, 1968, 1969
Coupe de France: 1967–68, 1969–70

As a manager
Bordeaux
Division 1: 1983–84, 1984–85, 1986–87
Coupe de France: 1985–86, 1986–87
Trophée des Champions: 1986

France
FIFA World Cup: 1998

Individual
French Manager of the Year: 1981, 1984, 1998
French Manager of the Century
IFFHS World's Best National Coach: 1998
European Coach of the Year—Tommaso Maestrelli Award: 1998
Onze d'Or Coach of the Year: 1998
Berlin-Britz Manager of the Decade (1990s)

Orders
Knight of the Legion of Honour: 1998
Officer of the Legion of Honour: 2006

References

External links

1941 births
Living people
Sportspeople from Loire (department)
French footballers
France international footballers
Association football midfielders
AS Saint-Étienne players
Olympique Lyonnais players
French football managers
Olympique Lyonnais managers
FC Girondins de Bordeaux managers
Montpellier HSC managers
AS Nancy Lorraine managers
France national football team managers
UEFA Euro 1996 managers
1998 FIFA World Cup managers
FIFA World Cup-winning managers
INF Clairefontaine managers
Ligue 1 managers
Chevaliers of the Légion d'honneur
Officiers of the Légion d'honneur
Footballers from Auvergne-Rhône-Alpes